The 2018 Guangzhou R&F season is the 8th year in Guangzhou R&F's existence and its 8th season in the Chinese football league, also its 7th season in the top flight.

Review 
8 November 2017, Guangzhou R&F confirmed that Dragan Stojković signed a renewed contract with Guangzhou R&F until the end of the 2021.
5 December 2017, Guangzhou R&F confirmed that Huang Zhengyu signed a renewed contract with Guangzhou R&F until the end of the 2022.
25 December 2017, Guangzhou R&F confirmed that Cheng Yuelei signed a renewed contract with Guangzhou R&F until the end of the 2022.
15 January 2018, Guangzhou R&F confirmed that Zhang Chenlong signed a renewed contract with Guangzhou R&F until the end of the 2021.
26 February 2018, Guangzhou R&F confirmed that Eran Zahavi signed a renewed contract with Guangzhou R&F until the end of the 2020.
28 February 2018, Guangzhou R&F confirmed that Renatinho signed a renewed contract with Guangzhou R&F until the end of the 2020.
25 April 2018, Guangzhou R&F confirmed that Yi Teng signed a renewed contract with Guangzhou R&F until the end of the 2022.
26 April 2018, Guangzhou R&F confirmed that Lu Lin signed a renewed contract with Guangzhou R&F until the end of the 2020.

Coaching and medical staff 

{|class="wikitable"
|-
!Position
!Staff
|-
|Head coach|| Dragan Stojković
|-
|rowspan="2"|Assistant coaches|| Žarko Đurović (to May 16)
|-
| Dejan Govedarica
|-
|rowspan="2"|Fitness coaches|| Katsuhito Kinoshi
|-
| Divan Augustyn (from June)
|-
|Goalkeeper coach|| Huang Hongtao
|-
|Team leader|| Huang Jun
|-
|rowspan="3"|Team physicians|| Marco van der Steen
|-
| Mai Zhiyuan
|-
| Fan Bihua
|-
|Performance manager|| Bito Wu
|-
|rowspan="2"|Interpreters|| Hong Wenjie
|-
| Weng Zhanhong
|-

Squad

Winter

First team

Reserve team

Summer

First team

Reserve team

Transfers

Winter

In

Out

Summer

In

Out

R&F (Hong Kong)

Friendlies

Pre-season

Mid-season

Competitions

Chinese Super League

Table

Results by round

Results summary

League Matches

Chinese FA Cup

Statistics

Appearances and goals

Goalscorers

Disciplinary record

Notes

References 

Chinese football clubs 2018 season
Guangzhou City F.C. seasons